Clark County Sheriff's Department can refer to the following law enforcement units:

 Clark County Sheriff's Department (Illinois) - Clark County, Illinois
 Clark County Sheriff's Department (Kentucky) - Clark County, Kentucky
 Clark County Sheriff's Department (Nevada) - Clark County, Nevada
 Clark County Sheriff's Department (Washington) - Clark County, Washington
 Clark County Sheriff's Department - Clark County, Wisconsin

Additionally, Clark County Sheriff's Department may refer to:
 Clark County Sheriff's Office (Arkansas) - Clark County, Arkansas
 Clark County Sheriff's Office (Idaho) - Clark County, Idaho
 Clark County Sheriff's Office (Kansas) - Clark County, Kansas
 Clark County Sheriff's Office (Missouri) - Clark County, Missouri
 Clark County Sheriff's Office (Ohio) - Clark County, Ohio
 Clarke County Sheriff Office (Alabama) - Clarke County, Alabama
 Clarke County Sheriff's Office (Georgia) - Clarke County, Georgia
 Lewis and Clark County Sheriff's Office - Lewis and Clark County, Montana